Carl Raymond Woodward (July 20, 1890 – October 2, 1974) was an American educator and college administrator who served from 1951 to 1958 as the first president of the University of Rhode Island.

He was born in the Tennent section of Manalapan Township, New Jersey and graduated in 1906 from Freehold High School in. He attended Rutgers University and earned his BS in 1914 and MA in 1919. He went on to get his PhD from Cornell University in 1926.

From 1920 to 1941, he held various position at Rutgers University. In 1941, he was named the 5th president of what was then Rhode Island State College. In 1951, Rhode Island State College achieved University status and he served as the 1st president of University of Rhode Island until his retirement in 1958. He was a member of the State of Rhode Island Heritage Hall of Fame.

References

1890 births
1974 deaths
Cornell University alumni
Freehold High School alumni
People from Manalapan Township, New Jersey
Rutgers University alumni
Rutgers University faculty
University of Rhode Island faculty
Presidents of the University of Rhode Island
20th-century American academics